Albanian Supercup 2004 is the 11th edition of the Albanian Supercup since its establishment in 1989. The match was contested between the Albanian Cup 2004 winners KF Partizani and the 2003–04 Albanian Superliga champions KF Tirana.

Match details

See also
 2003–04 Albanian Superliga
 2003–04 Albanian Cup

References

RSSSF.com

2004
Supercup
Albanian Supercup, 2004
Albanian Supercup, 2004